The Outbursts of Everett True (originally titled A Chapter from the Career of Everett True) was an American two-panel newspaper comic strip created by A.D. Condo and J. W. Raper that ran from July 22, 1905 to January 13, 1927, when Condo had to abandon it due to health reasons.

Two contemporary collections appeared in 1907 and 1921, and it was the Newspaper Enterprise Association's "most popular feature".  Subsequently, aside from occasional appearances in Alley Oop in 1969 the strip was largely forgotten until 1983 when one of the collections was reprinted that year, and comic book writer Tony Isabella and various artists employed the character in a new strip for the Comics Buyer's Guide and The Comics Journal. In this modernization, Everett True directed his outbursts at comic book artists, writers, publishers and distributors. In 2015, a new collection was published under the title Outbursts of Everett True with an introduction by Trevor Blake.

Characters and story
The original strip revolved around an ill-tempered man in late middle-age who was typically dressed in a suit and bowler hat of antiquated and comical appearance for the time. Without his hat he was completely bald. In the early cartoons he was moderately stout, but in the later ones he became increasingly portly. He often smoked a short cigar.

The first panel of each strip generally had someone inconveniencing or annoying True, an innocent bystander or an animal. In the second panel he would then make an ill-tempered outburst. In early cartoons this was usually an uninhibited rant which expressed what other people wanted to say, but were too polite to. Sometimes it was accompanied by comments from bystanders in speech-bubbles ("that's the way I like to hear a man talk"; "I wish I could hand out one like that"). Later cartoons were more slapstick in character. True would exact his revenge by either berating or (if confronting a man) pummelling the offender. The only character who occasionally turned the tables on True was his wife, who appeared occasionally to berate or beat him for some unacceptable behavior.

Adaptations
The American Bioscope Company made a series of silent short movies featuring Everett True, the first of which, Everett True Breaks Into the Movies, was released in 1916, starring Robert Bolder as Everett and Paula Reinbold as Mrs. True.

References

External links
 Barnacle Press: Outbursts of Everett True
 The Outbursts of Everett True at Don Markstein's Toonopedia. Archived from the original on September 7, 2015.

1905 comics debuts
1927 comics endings
American comics characters
American comic strips
Gag-a-day comics